Roberts Cliff is the third prominent rock bluff south of Seabee Hook on the east shore of Edisto Inlet. It was named by the New Zealand Geological Survey Antarctic Expedition (NZGSAE), 1957–58, for Charles L. Roberts, Jr., United States Antarctic Research Program (USARP) meteorologist and scientific leader at Hallett Station in 1959.

Cliffs of Victoria Land
Borchgrevink Coast